Exiles in Lotusland is a Canadian documentary film, directed by Ilan Saragosti and released in 2005. The film centres on Mélissa "Mélo" Cossette and Dany "Ti-Criss" Nadeau, two homeless teenagers from Quebec who have moved to Vancouver, where they are supporting themselves as squeegee kids.

The film premiered at the 2005 Whistler Film Festival, where it won the Borsos Competition award for Best Canadian Film.

References

External links

2005 films
2005 documentary films
Canadian documentary films
Documentary films about homelessness in Canada
Films shot in Vancouver
National Film Board of Canada documentaries
2000s Canadian films